Saint Vincent and the Grenadines participated at the 2018 Summer Youth Olympics in Buenos Aires, Argentina from 6 October to 18 October 2018.

Athletics

Beach volleyball

Saint Vincent and the Grenadines qualified a boys' and girls' team based on their performance at the 2018 EVCA Zone U19 Championship, however only sent their boys' team. 

 Boys' tournament - 1 team of 2 athletes

Rowing

Saint Vincent and the Grenadines were given a quota to compete in rowing.

 Boys' single sculls - 1 athlete

Swimming

References

2018 in Saint Vincent and the Grenadines
Nations at the 2018 Summer Youth Olympics
Saint Vincent and the Grenadines at the Youth Olympics